Aleksandr Nikolayevich Muzyka (born 26 February 1969) is a former Russian football player.

References

1969 births
Sportspeople from Khabarovsk
Living people
Soviet footballers
Russian footballers
FC Ural Yekaterinburg players
Russian Premier League players
FC Okean Nakhodka players
Association football forwards
FC SKA-Khabarovsk players